

List of Ambassadors

Dror Eydar (September 2, 2019 – present)
Ofer Sachs 2016 - 2019 (concurrently ambassador to FAO, WFP & IFAD, San Marino)
Naor Gilon 2012 - 2016
Gideon Meir 2006 - 2012
Ehud Gol 2001 - 2006
Yehuda Millo 1995 - 2001
Avi Pazner 1991 - 1995
Mordechai Drory 1986 - 1991
Moshe Alon 1979 - 1982
Zeev Shek 1977 - 1978
Moshe Sasson 1973 - 1977
Emil Najar 1968 - 1973
Ehud Avriel 1966 - 1968
Charge d'Affaires e.p. Nissim Yaish
Maurice Fischer 1961 - 1965
Eliahu Sasson 1953 - 1961
Charge d'Affaires e.p. Eliezer Halevi
Minister Moshe Ishay 1951 - 1952
Minister Shlomo Ginossar 1949 - 1951

Consulate (Milan)
Consul General Shmuel Tevet 1992 - 1996 
Consul General Daniel Gal 1987 - 1992
Consul General David Sultan 1985 - 1987
Consul General Avner Arazi 1976 - 1981
Consul General Nissim Yosha 1966 - 1968

References 

Italy
Israel